Æter (Aeter) is an electronic music band from Denmark with a female singer Gry Bagøien. The band existed from 1995 till 2001.

The band released one CD - "Luftantænder" - and several CD-Rs, toured a lot in Europe, created installation art.

The original concept was to arrange the coincidental meeting of sound and picture into so-called "everyday symphonies".

Discography 

 Oxygin (2005)
 Luftantænder (Helicopter Rec. 1998)

Band members 

 Gry Bagøien - vocals, loops, lyrics, gurgling, toys, radio scratch
 Jacob Kirkegaard - sampling, loops, sequences, beats, scratches
 1999-2001: Morten Meldgaard - vj, dialogues, video clips
 1996-1998: Zaki Youssef - guitar, electronics

References 
 Aeter-section on the web site of Jacob Kirkegaard

Danish electronic music groups